FRÏS  is a Danish vodka brand owned by the Sazerac Company.

History

FRÏS vodka was launched in the US in 1989 by Danish Distillers and Hiram Walker Distillers (Canada/US). Danish Distillers was sold in 1999 to V&S Group, which was then acquired by Pernod Ricard Group in 2008.  In 2016, the Sazerac Company acquired FRIS from Pernod Ricard.

Freeze distillation

The name “Frïs” links the Swedish word for "freeze" (frysa) and the Danish word for "ice" (is). The name refers both to Scandinavia and to its patented process of freeze filtration. However, the letter ï (I with a double dot) does not appear in any Scandinavian language except for Southern Sami.

FRÏS Vodka is  distilled four times and undergoes a freeze filtration process which removes impurities.  Once distilled, the spirit is then blended with water that has been naturally filtered.  This creates a clean, crisp taste.

FRÏS Vodka is 40% alcohol per volume (80 proof).

See also
List of Vodkas

References

External links
frisvodka.com

Danish vodkas